A wild card in card games is one that may be used to represent any other playing card, sometimes with certain restrictions. A card that is not wild may be referred to as a natural card. Jokers, however, may also have other uses, such as being a permanent top trump.

Wild cards may also exist in dedicated deck card games, such as the 'Master' card in Lexicon.

Use 
In most cases, the wild card or cards must be agreed upon by all players before the cards are dealt and play commences. There are two common rules regarding wild cards: "fully wild" cards and the "bug".

A card that is fully wild can be designated by its holder as any card they choose with no restrictions.  Under this rule, for example, a hand with any natural pair and a wild card becomes three of a kind.

Conversely, a bug is a limited wild. The common rule in casinos is that a wild card plays as a bug, which is given the rank of ace unless designating it as a different card would complete a straight, flush, or straight flush.

There is also a variation of the "Fully Wild" rule in which the wild card (in this instance they are usually jokers as there are traditionally only two and there is only one black and one red) can be any card of the suits matching the cards colour or current suit. For example, in a jokers wild game with these rules, the red joker could be used as any card of hearts or diamonds. Inversely, the black joker would be any card of clubs or spades.

Two exceptions to standard poker practice sometimes seen in home games are the double-ace flush rule, and the natural wins rule. The latter rule states that between hands that would otherwise tie, the hand with fewer wild cards wins. This is not common in casinos and should be treated as an exception to standard practice (as is the double-ace flush).

In some Austrian and South Tyrolean card games, one or more other cards may be used as wild cards, including the Weli, a special 6 of Bells, the 7 of Bells and 7 of Acorns. In the game of Perlaggen there are six or seven wild cards: four permanent Perlaggs - K or Maxl, 6  or Weli, 7 or Little Weli, the 7 of Bells or Bell-Spitz and 7 or Eichelspitz - as well as 3 "Trump Perlaggs" - the 7, Unter and Ober of Trumps.

Examples 
The following is a selection of cards and the games in which they are wild, based on Parlett:
 J - Boston, Guimbarde and Reversis
 7 - Perlaggen
 7  - Perlaggen
 K - Perlaggen
 S - Mus
 C - Mus
 Matto  - Ottocento
 Bègato - Ottocento
 Deuces - Wild-card Rummy, Push Rummy, Canasta, Brag

Footnotes and references 

Card game terminology
Poker gameplay and terminology